Centrifugal partition chromatography is a special chromatographic technique where both stationary and mobile phase are liquid, and the stationary phase is immobilized by a strong centrifugal force. Centrifugal partition chromatography consists of a series-connected network of extraction cells, which operates as elemental extractors, and the efficiency is guaranteed by the cascade.

History 
In the 1940s Craig invented the first apparatus to conduct countercurrent partitioning; he called this Countercurrent Distribution Craig apparatus consists of a series of glass tubes that are designed and arranged such that the lighter liquid phase is transferred from one tube to the next. The next major milestone was Droplet countercurrent chromatography (DCCC). It uses only gravity to move the mobile phase through the stationary phase which is held in long vertical tubes connected in series. The modern era of CCC began with the development of the planetary centrifuge by Ito which was first introduced in 1966 as a closed helical tube which was rotated on a "planetary" axis as is turned on a "sun" axis. 
Centrifugal partition chromatography was introduced in Japan in 1982; the first instrument was built at Sanki Eng. Ltd. in Kyoto. The first instrument consisted of twelve cartridges arranged around the rotor of a centrifuge; the inner volume of each cartridge was about 15 mL for 50 channels. In 1999 Kromaton was developed of the first FCPC with Radial Cells. During cell development, the Z cell was completed in 2005 and the twin cell in 2009. In 2017 RotaChrom designed its top performing CPC cells through Computed Fluid Dynamic simulation software. After thousands of simulations, this tool revealed the drawbacks of conventional CPC cell designs and highlighted the unparallel load capacity and scalable cell design of RotaChrom.

Operation 
The extraction cells consist of hollow bodies with inlets and outlets of liquid connection. The cells are first filled with the liquid chosen to be the stationary phase. Under rotation, the pumping of the mobile phase is started, which enters the cells from the inlet. When entering the flow of mobiles phase forms small droplets according to the Stokes' law, which is called atomization. These droplets fall through the stationary phase, creating a high interface area, which is called the extraction. At the end of the cells, these droplets unite due to the surface tension, which is called settling.

When a sample mixture is injected as a plug into the flow of mobile phase the compounds of the mixtures elute according to their partition coefficients: 

Centrifugal partition chromatography requires only a biphasic mixture of solvents, so by varying the constitution of the solvent system it is possible to tune the partition coefficients of different compounds so that separation is guaranteed by the high selectivity.

Comparison with countercurrent chromatography 

Countercurrent chromatography and centrifugal partition chromatography are two different instrumental realization of the same liquid–liquid chromatographic theory. Countercurrent chromatography usually uses a planetary gear motion without rotary seals, while centrifugal partition chromatography uses circular rotation with rotary seals for liquid connection. CCC has interchanging mixing and settling zones in the coil tube, so atomization, extraction and settling are time and zone separated. Inside centrifugal partition chromatography, all three steps happen continuously in one time, inside the cells.

Advantages of centrifugal partition chromatography:
 Higher flow rate for same volume size Laboratory scale example: 250 mL centrifugal partition chromatography has optimal flow rate of 5–15 mL/min, 250 mL countercurrent chromatography has optimal flow rate of 1–3 mL/min. Process scale example: 25 L countercurrent chromatography has optimal flow rate of 100–300 ml/min, 25 L centrifugal partition chromatography has optimal flow rate of 1000–3000 ml/min.
 Higher productivity (due to higher flow rate and faster separation time)
 Scalable up to tonnes per month
 Better stationary phase retention for most phases

Disadvantages of centrifugal partition chromatography:
 Higher pressure than CCC (typical operation pressures of 40-160 bar vs 5–25 bar)
 Rotary seal wear over time

Laboratory scale 
Centrifugal partition chromatography has been extensively used for isolation and purification of natural products for 40 years. Due to the ability to get very high selectivity, and the ability to tolerate samples containing particulated matter, it is possible to work with direct extracts of biomass, opposed to traditional liquid chromatography, where impurities degrade the solid stationary phase so that separation become impossible.

There are numerous laboratory scale centrifugal partition chromatography manufacturers around the world, like Gilson (Armen Instrument), Kromaton (Rousselet Robatel), and AECS-QUIKPREP. These instruments operate at flow rates of 1–500 mL/min. with stationary phase retentions of 40–80%.

Production scale 
Centrifugal partition chromatography does not uses any solid stationary phase, so it guarantees a cost-effective separation for the highest industrial levels. As opposed to countercurrent chromatography, it is possible to get very high flow rates (for example 10 liters / min) with active stationary phase ratio of >80%, which guarantees good separation and high productivity. As in centrifugal partition chromatography, material is dissolved, and loaded the column in mass / volume units, loading capability can be much higher than standard solid-liquid chromatographic techniques, where material is loaded to the active surface area of the stationary phase, which takes up less than 10% of the column.

Industrial instrument like Gilson (Armen Instrument), Kromaton (Rousselet Robatel) and RotaChrom Technologies (RotaChrom) differ from laboratory scale instruments by the applicable flow rate with satisfactory stationary phase retention (70-90%). Industrial instruments have flow rates of multiple liter / minutes, while able to purify materials from 10 kg to tonnes per month.

Operating the production scale equipment requires industrial volume solvent preparation (mixer/settler) and solvent recovery equipment.

See also 

 Radial chromatography

References 

 Centrifugal partition Chromatography - Chromatographic Science Series - Volume 68, Editor: Alain P. Foucault, Marcel Dekker Inc

Chromatography